Stigmella alnetella is a moth of the family Nepticulidae. It is found in all of Europe, except the Balkan Peninsula.

The wingspan is 3.9-4.8 mm. Head orange, collar deep bronze-fuscous. Antennal eyecaps white. Forewings golden brown, becoming lighter golden towards dorsum anteriorly; a bright shining silvery fascia beyond middle, preceded by a dark purplish-fuscous suffusion, apical area beyond this dark purplish fuscous. Hindwings grey.

The larvae feed on Alnus cordata and Alnus glutinosa. They mine the leaves of their host plant. There is usually only one mine in a leaf. Pupation takes place outside of the mine.

References

External links
bladmineerders.nl
Swedish Moths
Fauna Europaea
Stigmella alnetella images at  Consortium for the Barcode of Life
 

Nepticulidae
Moths of Europe
Moths described in 1856